Óscar Contreras Ferreira (born 3 December 1997) is a Spanish footballer who plays for SD Ponferradina B as an attacking midfielder.

Club career
Born in Ponferrada, Castile and León, Contreras represented AD Ca La Guidó and CA Bembibre as a youth. After making his first-team debut during the 2015–16 season in the Tercera División, he subsequently became a regular for the side.

In June 2019, Contreras signed for SD Ponferradina and was initially assigned to the reserves in the regional leagues. He made his debut as a professional on 20 July of the following year, coming on as a late substitute for goalscorer Iván Rodríguez in a 1–2 away loss against Real Zaragoza in the Segunda División.

References

External links

1997 births
Living people
People from Ponferrada
Sportspeople from the Province of León
Spanish footballers
Footballers from Castile and León
Association football midfielders
Segunda División players
Tercera División players
Divisiones Regionales de Fútbol players
SD Ponferradina B players
SD Ponferradina players